Albert T. Morgan (died 1922) was an American Civil War soldier and Reconstruction-era politician.

Albert Morgan may also refer to:
Tod Morgan (Albert Morgan Pilkington, 1902–1953), American boxer
Al Morgan (musician) (1908–1974), American jazz musician
Albert Morgan, character in 1958 American television film The Fountain of Youth

See also
Bert Morgan (disambiguation)
Al Morgan (disambiguation)